Kettle Pond State Park is a state park near Marshfield, Vermont in the United States. It is one of seven state parks located in Groton State Forest. The park is on Vermont Route 232 two miles west of Groton.

The park is located on Kettle Pond (109 acres), an undeveloped pond. Activities includes camping, boating, fishing, swimming, hiking, snowshoeing and cross-country skiing.

Features include 26 lean-tos arranged into five separate groups designed to accommodate groups. there are also individual lean-tos There is a composting toilet for each group site and two double pit toilets, but no potable water at this site. There are six remote campsites/lean-tos on the pond.

References

External links
Official website

State parks of Vermont
Protected areas of Washington County, Vermont
Marshfield, Vermont